Chromatin assembly factor 1 subunit A is a protein that in humans is encoded by the CHAF1A gene.

Function 

Chromatin assembly factor I (CAF-1) is a nuclear complex consisting of p50, p60 (CHAF1B; MIM 601245), and p150 (CHAF1A) subunits that assembles histone tetramers onto replicating DNA in vitro (Kaufman et al., 1995).[supplied by OMIM]

Interactions 

CHAF1A has been shown to interact with:
 ASF1A, 
 ASF1B, 
 BLM, 
 CBX5, and
 MBD1.

References

Further reading

External links